Nishida Miho (born December 16, 1992) is a Filipino-born Japanese television personality, who became the Big Winner of the second batch of Pinoy Big Brother: 737 housemates in 2015.

Early life
Nishida Miho was born on December 16, 1992, in Angono, Rizal, Philippines, but her mother, who worked as an entertainer, brought her to Japan when she was two years old and single-handedly raised her there.  Having been exposed to Japanese culture and language for most of her life, she only understands and speaks a little English. She is a single mother; her daughter Aimi was born in 2010.

Career
After winning Pinoy Big Brother: 737 – Part 2, Nishida joined the cast of It's Showtime, partaking in its "Tomiho Realiserye" current segment, along with her co-competitor and ex-boyfriend Tommy Esguerra. She's also a former member of All Female Dance Group Girltrends.

Filmography

Television

Movies

Concerts/Tours

In December 2017, Miho held her first ever major concert "Miho: I Am Unstoppable" in Music Museum with special guests JV "Young JV" Kapunan, Zeus Collins, Mikee Agustin and Yexel Sebastian.

In February 2018, together with her rumored boyfriend JV Kapunan formerly known as "Young JV" had their post Valentines Pop up concert titled "It's Happening! A night with JHo".

In April 2018, Miho joined Kisses Delavin and Thony Labrusca in a Singapore concert.

Discography

In February 2018, JV Kapunan released his first single for 2018 entitled "123" featuring Miho in three languages which talks about their story on how they met.

It's also Miho's first recording of original song. Music Video was released March 9, 2018 shot in Boracay by International Director and Choreographer Lenny Dela Peña popularly known as Lenny Len.

Music and Lyrics by Toronto Base singer- songwriter Andrew Briol and Filipino singer- songwriter Thyro Alfaro. The Japanese part of the Lyrics was translated by Miho herself.

References

External links
 

1992 births
Actresses of Japanese descent
Big Brother (franchise) winners
Filipino film actresses
Filipino people of Japanese descent
Living people
Naturalized citizens of Japan
Star Magic
People from Rizal
People from Tokyo
Pinoy Big Brother contestants
Filipino television actresses
Actors from Rizal